The 2018 Nielsen Pro Tennis Championship was a professional tennis tournament played on hard courts. It was the 27th edition of the tournament which was part of the 2018 ATP Challenger Tour. It took place in Winnetka, Illinois, between 9 and 14 July 2018.

Singles main-draw entrants

Seeds

 1 Rankings are as of July 2, 2018.

Other entrants
The following players received wildcards into the singles main draw:
  Tom Fawcett
  Martin Joyce
  Thai-Son Kwiatkowski
  Danny Thomas

The following players received entry into the singles main draw using protected rankings:
  Tom Jomby
  Nicolas Meister

The following players received entry from the qualifying draw:
  Collin Altamirano
  Aziz Dougaz
  Guy Orly Iradukunda
  Martin Redlicki

Champions

Singles

  Evgeny Karlovskiy def.  Jason Jung 6–3, 6–2.

Doubles

  Austin Krajicek /  Jeevan Nedunchezhiyan def.  Roberto Maytín /  Christopher Rungkat 6–7(4–7), 6–4, [10–5].

References

2018 ATP Challenger Tour
2018
2018 in American tennis
2018 in sports in Illinois
July 2018 sports events in the United States